Fifteen-Year-Old Captain, is a 1945 Soviet adventure film directed by Vasily Zhuravlyov.

Plot 
The film tells about the fifteen-year-old sailor Dick Sand, who as a result of the betrayal of the ship's cocago Negoro is on the banks of Angola, where his adventures begin.

This is an adaptation of Jules Verne's novel Dick Sand, A Captain at Fifteen.

Starring 
 Vsevolod Larionov as Master Dick Sand
 Yelena Izmailova as Mrs. Weldon
 Mikhail Astangov as Sebastian Pereira, alias Negoro
 Weyland Rodd as Hercules, sailor (as Veiland Rodd)
 Azharik Messerer as Jackie Weldon
 Coretti Arle Titz as Nan
 Aleksandr Khvylya as Whaler Captain Hull (as A. Khvyla)
 Viktor Kulakov as Arthur Garris
 Osip Abdulov as Jose Antonio Alvarez
 Sergei Tsenin as L.T. Worby, shipping agent
 Ivan Bobrov as King Muani-Lung (as I. Bobrov)
 Aram Kuk as Thomas
 Pavel Sukhanov as Cousin Benedict

References

External links 
 

1945 films
1940s Russian-language films
Soviet adventure films
1945 adventure films
Soviet black-and-white films
Films based on works by Jules Verne